The following page lists some power stations in Portugal.

Cogeneration

Geothermal

Hydroelectric

Thermal

See also 
 List of power stations in Europe
 List of largest power stations in the world

References 

Portugal
 
Power stations